= The Green Initiative =

- Founded: 2015
- Website: https://www.greeninitiative.eco

The Green Initiative is an international climate certification and advisory services company, responsible for the certification of Machu Picchu as the first carbon neutral tourism destination world-wide, as well as the certification of big players such as adidas and AJE Group . Green Initiative designs climate positive mitigation solutions to address climate change risks, market challenges, and innovation opportunities linked to the Paris Agreement and the Sustainable Development Goals. They are one of 24 companies accredited by the United Nations to provide climate change advisory services. The Green Initiative's main objectives include the offsetting of greenhouse gases emitted by human activities, as well as with reforestation projects in riparian areas that need to be recovered. The trees planted from these projects will absorb carbon dioxide from the atmosphere, as well as environmental benefits, such as water and air quality preservation, and biodiversity protection.
